"Under blågul fana" is a well-known Swedish march from the early 20th-century composed by Viktor Widqvist (1881–1952). Its date of composition is unknown, but the oldest known version (from the archive of the Royal Swedish Navy Band in Stockholm) dates from 1916. The march became very popular during World War II in Sweden and is de facto the national march of Sweden. It was adopted as the march of the Swedish armed forces in 1999. The march is also quoted in Leroy Anderson's arrangement of Seventy-Six Trombones.

References

External links
Militärmusiksamfundet 

Swedish military marches